Virodhi is a 1992 Indian Bollywood drama film produced and directed by Rajkumar Kohli. It stars the debuting Armaan Kohli and Harsha Mehra in pivotal roles with Sunil Dutt, Dharmendra and Anita Raj in supporting roles. The movie was the debut movie for actor Armaan Kohli. This movie was amongst few movies which were promoted as multistarrer villain movies.

Plot
Inspector Shekhar gets involved in an illegal case which involves ministers like Pandey Sahib & his alliances. When Inspector Shekhar tries to bring justice against them he gets killed by the hooligans of Pandey Sahib. It's up to his younger brother Raj to avenge his brother's death by trusting law and justice or by taking the law into his own hands.

Cast
 Armaan Kohli as Raj
 Harsha Mehra as Pinky
 Sunil Dutt as Police Commissioner
 Dharmendra as Inspector Shekhar
 Anita Raj as Mrs. Shekhar
 Roopa Ganguly as Reena
 Prem Chopra as Bhagwat Pandey
 Paresh Rawal as Badrinath Pandey
 Gulshan Grover as Rocky Pandey
 Shakti Kapoor as Pratap
 Raza Murad as Vithalrao Patil
 Kiran Kumar as Kumar
 Amjad Khan as Judge
 Sharat Saxena as Inspector Amar Singh 
 Shiva Rindani as Inspector Naagraj
 Bharat Kapoor as Sub Inspector 
 Dan Dhanoa as Sub Inspector 
 Rajeev Anand
 Mahaveer Bhullar as College Goon
 Kamalraj Bhasin as Hawaldar
 Rajan Haksar as Inspector 
 Janakidas as Janakidas
 Ghanshyam Rohera as Restaurant Manager 
 Naushad Abbas as Fighter
 Harbans Darshan M. Arora as Politician
 Surendra Rahi as Man In Crowd
 Kedarnath Saigal as Advocate 
 Rajeet Sood as Principal 
 Sunita as Lady Inspector

Soundtrack
All songs are written by Dev Kohli.

References

External links

1990s Hindi-language films
1992 films
Films scored by Anu Malik